Cornelia Derrick Lampton (1896 – August 9, 1928), later Cornelia Lampton Dawson, was an American pianist and music educator. She was the first woman to earn a bachelor's degree in music at Howard University.

Early life and education 
Cornelia (or Cornella) Derrick Lampton was from Greenville, Mississippi, the youngest daughter of clergyman Edward Wilkinson Lampton and Lula M. Lampton. The family moved to Chicago after one of her sisters demanded to be addressed as "Miss Lampton" by the phone company, and the argument escalated to threats against the family.

She was the first woman to earn a bachelor's degree at Howard University's Conservatory of Music, graduating in 1914. She attended the Chicago Musical College, where she studied piano with Alexander Raab and Percy Grainger, and from 1925 to 1927 pursued further studies in piano with James Friskin, on a scholarship at the Juilliard Musical Foundation.

Career 
Cornelia Lampton performed as a pianist in recitals and on radio programs, and taught piano. She was also music editor of the Chicago Whip. She was a member of the National Association of Negro Musicians, and the Chicago Music Association. In 1927, she spoke and played at the 137th Street YWCA in New York, giving a program on "song and folk song."

Personal life and legacy 
Cornelia Lampton married composer and musician William Levi Dawson in May 1927. She died in August 1928, aged 32, in Chicago. Reports ascribed her death to complications after an appendectomy. Her remains were buried in Greenville. One of her students, Vivienne Shurland, established the Cornelia Lampton Scholarship Fund in her memory, for music students at Howard University.

References 

1896 births
1928 deaths
People from Greenville, Mississippi
20th-century American pianists
Howard University alumni
Juilliard School alumni
20th-century American women pianists
Musicians from Mississippi
Chicago Musical College alumni